FC Hebros is a Bulgarian football club based in Harmanli playing in the A RFG Haskovo, the fourth division of Bulgarian football. Its home stadium "Hebros" has a capacity of 5 000 seats. Its best achievement was participating in the Bulgarian "B" Professional Football Group. Club colors are green and white. FC Hebros was officially founded in 1921. Between 1982 and 1984 for the club had played famous Bulgarian forward Hristo Stoichkov (the European Footballer of the Year in 1994).

Honors 
 Bulgarian Cup - 1/8 Final: 1946, 1985
 12 place in the National Championship in 1935
 11th place in the South "B" Championship in 1956

Current squad

Notable players
  Hristo Stoichkov
  Dimitar Marashliev
  Zhelyo Zhelev
  Georgi Karaneychev

Past seasons

External links 
 

Football clubs in Bulgaria
Association football clubs established in 1921
1921 establishments in Bulgaria